Deepsouth is a 2012 American documentary film about the neglected HIV/AIDS crisis in the rural American South. Beneath layers of history, poverty, and soaring HIV infections, three Americans redefine traditional Southern values to create their own solutions to survive.

On December 1, 2014, the film was self-distributed and digitally released. Seventy communities across the United States screened deepsouth for World AIDS Day with a 10-hour live-stream with cast/crew.

Synopsis
Joshua Alexander, a college student, seeks the support of an underground gay family miles away from his suffocating Mississippi Delta hometown. With no funds and few resources, Monica Johnson tries tirelessly to unite reluctant participants at her annual HIV retreat in rural Louisiana. Kathie Hiers, an Alabama activist, spends 120 days a year on the road fighting a bureaucracy that continues to ignore the South.

Critical reception
The film has become the quiet anthem of the current HIV/AIDS movement in the U.S. deepsouth has toured the international LGBTQ and human rights festival circuits, and was invited into communities on a 150-stop grassroots tour. Director Lisa Biagiotti has been invited to The White House, featured in The New Yorker, and has presented the issue at the Clinton Global Initiative University.

The film is being taught as part of public health, law, journalism, sociology, nursing, gender studies and rural  studies programs in universities across the country. The Mississippi Department of Health leverages deepsouth for sensitivity and anti-stigma training of new hire Disease Intervention Specialists.

deepsouth is an unconventional social issues documentary because of its approach to storytelling and style. Its three-part narrative embeds research and data in every scene, but without expert interviews or statistical plot points.

Journalism

Sarah Stillman's article in The New Yorker noted that deepsouth “burrows into the crevices of culture, where statistics can’t quite creep.”
Jina Moore's article on translating public health into media in the Columbia Journalism Review stated: "There are no experts, no statistics, and no messaging in Biagiotti’s film. In fact, she wouldn’t even call it a film about HIV. 'HIV was really the setting of deepsouth, not the topic or the issue,' she told me."

Science

In the peer-reviewed medical journal The Lancet, Rebecca Heald asserted: "It is astounding that the HIV crisis in the southern states of the USA still seems to be of such low priority to individuals who have the power to make a difference. Without taking anything away from the hard-working protagonists in deepsouth, the lack of political support for their efforts to combat stigma for people with HIV/AIDS makes the goal of achieving a more open and understanding society seem as distant and remote as the towns and villages in which these people live."
Oriol R. Gutierrez Jr. endorsed the film in the HIV community with his cover story in the monthly magazine POZ: “From slavery to segregation to HIV, the Southern United States sadly has traded one societal ill for another. The documentary deepsouth sheds new light on why the region has not overcome its struggle to break free of AIDS.” 

Film/art

Anthony Kaufman from SundanceNOW wrote: "Lisa Biagiotti's deepsouth is a more evocative exploration of gay black Americans...Thanks to Joey Lindquist's well-paced editing and Duy Linh Tu's mix of verite' and elegiac cinematography capturing the scorching sun, marshes and lush greenery of Alabama, Louisiana and Mississippi deepsouth transcends straight-forward advocacy to become an affecting and resonant portrait of an AIDS crisis that hits closer to home..."
Hassan Vawda of UK-based Polari Magazine said: "With two years of subtle organic research of the area, learning the surroundings and most effectively, getting to know the people there, director Lisa Biagiotti scratches the surface and transcends the heavy weight of the issue by tackling it in an incredibly effective way – choreographing a fluid dance between information and art."
Drew Gibson concluded in Daily Kos: “Ultimately, deepsouth succeeds in the only thing a piece of art need succeed at: it speaks to people. Documentaries like An Inconvenient Truth or Bowling For Columbine don’t speak to people. They speak at people. In deepsouth, director Lisa Biagiotti and the entire cast & crew of the film do what southerners do best. They charm you.”

Film festivals
Human Rights Watch Film Festival (Providence, RI)
Human Rights Watch Film Festival (San Francisco, CA)
Human Rights Watch Film Festival (Washington, DC)
Human Rights Watch Film Festival (Tucson, AZ)
Human Rights Watch Film Festival (Gambier, OH)
Clarksdale Film Festival (Clarksdale, MS)
Human Rights Watch Film Festival (Oneonta, NY)
IX Cinema Mostra Aids (São Paulo, Brazil)
Florence Queer Festival (Florence, Italy)
Reeling: The Chicago Lesbian & Gay International Film Festival (Chicago, IL)
Polari Film Festival (Austin, TX)
Pensacola LGBT Film Festival (Pensacola, FL)
4th Annual Queer Film Festival (Towson, MD)
Portland Lesbian & Gay Film Festival (Portland, OR)
Outfest Los Angeles LGBT Film Festival (Los Angeles, CA)
Human Rights Watch Film Festival (New York, NY)
Key West PRIDE Film Festival (Key West, FL)
Boston LGBT Film Festival (Boston, MA)
Crossroads Film Festival (Jackson, MS)
Fringe! London Gay Film Festival (London, UK)
Outflix Film Festival (Memphis, TN)
Sidewalk Motion Picture Festival (Birmingham, AL)

Awards

References

External links

deepsouth Official Website
Lisa Biagiotti Official Website

Documentary films about poverty in the United States
Films shot in Mississippi
Films shot in Alabama
Films set in Louisiana
Films shot in New Orleans
Culture of the Southern United States
Documentary films about racism in the United States
Documentary films about HIV/AIDS
Documentary films about African Americans
2012 directorial debut films
2012 films
2010s English-language films
American documentary films
HIV/AIDS in American films
2010s American films